The IRI T22B is an Italian helicopter that was designed and produced by Italian Rotors Industries of Aprilia, Lazio. Now out of production, when it was available the aircraft was supplied complete and ready-to-fly.

The company seems to have been founded about 2013 and gone out of business in June 2016, ending production.

Design and development
The T22B features a single main rotor and tail rotor, a two-seats-in side-by-side configuration enclosed cockpit with a windshield, skid landing gear and a four-cylinder, air-cooled, four stroke  Lycoming O-320-B2C aircraft engine.

The aircraft fuselage is made from composites.

In 2015, reviewer Werner Pfaendler described the T22B's design as "elegant".

Variants
T22B
Version with  Lycoming O-320-B2C powerplant.
T23B
Version with  Lycoming O-360-A2J powerplant.

Specifications (T22B)

See also
List of rotorcraft

References

External links
Official website archives on Archive.org

T22B
2010s Italian sport aircraft
2010s Italian civil utility aircraft
2010s Italian helicopters